Emidio Oddi (born 22 July 1956 in Castorano) is a retired Italian professional footballer who played as a defender.

Career
Oddi played for 8 seasons in the Serie A for Hellas Verona F.C., A.S. Roma and Udinese Calcio. He also played for Roma in the 1983–84 European Cup, scoring a goal in the quarterfinal against BFC Dynamo. He did not play in the final defeat to Liverpool.

Honours
Verona
Serie B: 1981–82

Roma
Coppa Italia: 1983–84, 1985–86

1956 births
Living people
Italian footballers
Serie A players
Serie B players
Fermana F.C. players
A.C. Ancona players
Hellas Verona F.C. players
A.S. Roma players
Udinese Calcio players
Pro Sulmona Calcio 1921 players
Association football defenders